Dhokal Singh Basnyat served as the governor of the Kumaon and Garhwal kingdoms. He is the youngest son of Senapati Shivaram Singh Basnyat and was the first owner of Narayanhiti Palace.

References

Year of birth missing
Year of death missing
Nepalese politicians
Basnyat family
People of the Nepalese unification